Wyszonki is an okolica szlachecka in Podlasie, at the Nurzec river. It is the nest of Wyszyński noble family. It is divided into several villages:

Wyszonki Kościelne (the central settlement, with the church)
Wyszonki-Błonie
Wyszonki-Klukówek
Wyszonki-Nagórki
Wyszonki-Włosty
Wyszonki-Wojciechy
Wyszonki-Wypychy

Wysokie Mazowieckie County